Krapina is a town in northern Croatia and the administrative centre of Krapina-Zagorje County with a population of 4,482 (2011) and a total municipality population of 12,480 (2011).

Population

The following settlements comprise the Krapina municipality:

 Bobovje, population 510
 Doliće, population 436
 Donja Šemnica, population 912
 Gornja Pačetina, population 404
 Krapina, population 4,471
 Lazi Krapinski, population 79
 Lepajci, population 391
 Mihaljekov Jarek, population 469
 Podgora Krapinska, population 565
 Polje Krapinsko, population 666
 Pretkovec, population 66
 Pristava Krapinska, population 214
 Strahinje, population 328
 Straža Krapinska, population 42
 Škarićevo, population 707
 Šušelj Brijeg, population 4
 Tkalci, population 432
 Trški Vrh, population 399
 Velika Ves, population 727
 Vidovec Krapinski, population 215
 Vidovec Petrovski, population 101
 Zagora, population 94
 Žutnica, population 248

History
Krapina has been known since 1193. It has always been a favorite site for castles and country houses of Croatian and Hungarian rulers.

In the first half of the 15th century, it was an important center of the Counts of Celje, who additionally fortified the town and expanded the nearby castle. Later, it came in the possession of the Keglević family.

In the late 19th and early 20th century, Krapina was a district capital in Varaždin County of the Kingdom of Croatia-Slavonia.

Prehistoric site

In 1899, on a hill called Hušnjakovo near modern Krapina, the archaeologist and paleontologist Dragutin Gorjanović-Kramberger found over eight hundred fossil remains belonging to Neanderthals.

The half-cave in Krapina was soon listed among the world's science localities as a rich fossil finding site, where the largest and richest collection of the Neanderthal man had ever been found.

At the site where the Neanderthal remains were discovered there is now a state-of-the-art Neanderthal museum which also includes an extensive section on evolution, making it one of the most interesting evolutionary museums in Europe. It is surrounded by a park with many statues of Neanderthals and the game they hunted, a bear, a moose and a beaver set in the actual locations.

Culture

Krapina is home to the yearly Festival kajkavske popevke (The festival of kajkavian song) sung in the local Kajkavian language.

There is also a nearby municipality of Krapinske Toplice (Krapina spa) with numerous thermal springs and spa tourist infrastructure. Krapina is also the birthplace of the linguist and language reformer Ljudevit Gaj. His home is now a museum where visitors can learn about his life and work.

Since 1997, Franciscan monastery and St. Catherine's church in Krapina are hosts of the Krapinafest, annual contemporary Christian music festival.

Transportation 
Krapina has a train station on R106 railway corridor of regional significance (Zabok-Krapina-Đurmanec-Hromec-border with Slovenia) and a bus station which also serves as a hub for the bus company "Presečki d.o.o." - the company connects Krapina with numerous of towns across the county and region with lines such as Krapina-Zagreb, Krapina-Macelj, Krapina-Đurmanec, Krapina-Hum na Sutli, Krapina-Jesenje, etc.

References

External links

 
 Kraneamus - Krapina Neanderthal Museum

Spa towns in Croatia
Cities and towns in Croatia
Populated places in Krapina-Zagorje County
Varaždin County (former)
12th-century establishments in Croatia
1193 establishments in Europe